Drinking Gasoline is a 1985 EP release (taking the form of two 12" singles) by Cabaret Voltaire, originally released on the Some Bizzare label and distributed through Virgin Records. All four tracks are featured on the band's "Gasoline in Your Eye" videocassette, also issued in 1985. All known copies of the original UK pressing had labels on the wrong discs (ie, side 1 label on side 3, side 2 label on side 4.) It peaked at #71 in the UK.

Track listing
All songs were written by Richard H. Kirk and Stephen Mallinder.

Personnel
Cabaret Voltaire
 Stephen Mallinder – vocals, bass, production
 Richard H. Kirk – guitars, keyboards, production
Other personnel
 Mark Tattersall – drums on "Kino" and "Sleepwalking"
 Paul White – artwork

References

 Liner notes

1985 EPs
Cabaret Voltaire (band) EPs
Virgin Records EPs